La chamuscada ("The Charred") is a 1971 Mexican film. It was written by Luis Alcoriza.

External links
 

1971 films
Mexican war drama films
1970s Spanish-language films
1970s Mexican films